Crunchy Frog is an independent record label, established in 1994 in Copenhagen, Denmark.

The label is owned by the four members of Thau. The daily operations are handled by Jesper "Yebo" Reginal Petersen, drummer of Thau (later: Tothe International,) The Tremolo Beer Gut, Psyched Up Janis, Trains and Boats and Planes, Heavy Trash and Junior Senior. The label also owns and operates Vibrashop, an online mail order record store.

Among the bands that have released albums on Crunchy Frog are: Thau, Tothe International, Learning from Las Vegas, The Naked, Superheroes, Düreforsög, The Mopeds, The Raveonettes, Junior Senior, PowerSolo, Heavy Trash, Wolfkin, Sterling, epo-555, Beta Satan, 18th Dye, Lars and The Hands of Light, Thee Attacks, Apparat Organ Quartet, Shiny Darkly, The Malpractice, Snake & Jet's Amazing Bullit Band, Oliver North Boy Choir, ONBC, Kim and the Cinders, D/troit, The Tremolo Beer Gut, Late Runner, Yune, The Entrepreneurs, Luster, Ki!, Jenny Wilson and First Floor Power.

The name of the record company is taken from a Monty Python sketch about a pair of policemen who question the head of a confectioners about his new product, "The Whizzo Quality Assortment," which includes "Crunchy Frog."

Bands signed to Crunchy Frog
epo-555...is a Danish indie pop band (2002-2009). They managed to release two albums and an EP during their existence. Albums Dexter Fox (2004) and Mafia (2006) as well as the EP Mafia Fallout were released on Crunchy Frog.
Heavy Trash
Junior Senior
Learning From Las Vegas...is an indie rock band formed in the early 1990s by Klaus Mandal Hansen. After some demos, touring in Germany and a release of the single Ten Thousand Songs, Learning From Las Vegas released their debut album Memory Babe on Crunchy Frog in 1996. Their second album Petit Bourgeois, recorded in Tambourine Studios in Sweden, was released in 1999. In 2003, Learning From Las Vegas released their latest album Richard and Liz, recorded and produced by Thomas Troelsen at his Delta Lab Studio. In 2004 Learning From Las Vegas supported The Raveonettes as well as playing By:Larm in Bergen, Norway and SxSW in Austin, TX.
The Mopeds
Beta Satan...is a band from the Danish town of Aarhus. Playing an uncompromising variety of rock n' roll with hints of electro, heavy and noise the five piece was signed to Crunchy Frog upon releasing a split 7-inch on Play/Rec with Lack. In 2008 Beta Satan released their debut album Girls. Since releasing Girls - Mistreated and Remixed (2009), the band has dropped their latest hint of their continued existence by contributing to Apparat Organ Quartet's Pólýfónía Remixes.
Powersolo...is an indie rock duo started in 1996 in Arhus, Denmark. Powersolo plays trashy, noisy, psychobilly rock inspired by Hasil Adkins, The Cramps and Southern Culture on the Skids. At one point a trio, Powersolo is now constituted as a duo of Kim Kix and Atomic Child after drummer J. C. Benz has left the outfit. Their debut album Lemon Half Moon was released on the Danish label Kick Music in 2001. Since 2004, they have been on the books at Crunchy Frog and have released four albums, while also doing movie soundtracks, Christmas specials and working several side projects.
Snake & Jet's Amazing Bullit Band is an indie rock band from Copenhagen, Denmark consisting of Thor Rasmussen and Thomas Frederiksen. Snake & Jet's Amazing Bullit Band play a distinct retro inspired rock with influences from genres such as punk, blues, synth pop and psychedelic rock. Since they started playing in 2003, Snake & Jet have released several CD-Rs complete with homemade artwork. However, they have been under contract with Crunchy Frog since 2007. In 2007 they released their debut album X-Ray Spirit and along with critical acclaim, the song Favourite was a...favourite with DR P3's Det Elektriske Barometer. While X-Ray Spirit was built on Hammond organs and drums, Snake & Jet's Amazing Bullit Band's second album Peace Boat (2009) took a turn towards a darker more psychedelic shade of rock. Snake & Jet were able to present that evolution at SxSW, where they performed at the Danish Dynamite Day Party along with Powersolo, Efterklang and Choir of Young Believers. In 2012, Snake & Jet's Amazing Bullit Band released their latest album Stuff That Rotates. The album, which picked up on the evolution made clear by Peace Boat, received lukewarm reviews in Denmark. It did, however, face admirable recognition in UK magazines Artrocker, Clash and Line of Best Fit. Since the release of Stuff That Rotates, Snake & Jet's Amazing Bullit Band's live ensemble has included bass player Laura Ratschau.
Superheroes
THAU...is an indie rock group consisting of Ulrik Petersen, Jesper Reginal Petersen, Jesper Rofelt and Jesper Sand, also the founders of Crunchy Frog Records. THAU has released three albums and an EP, the latest being the album All It Takes Is Everything (2001).
Tothe International
The Tremolo Beer Gut
Wolfkin... is a Danish rock duo consisting of Christian Gotfredsen and Lars Vognstrup. In 2006, Wolfkin released their only album so far. Brand New Pants takes sleazy country, electronic shenanigans and lounge to a rock base.
Kim and the Cinders...is a side project of Powersolo front man Kim 'Kix' Jeppesen. The other members are Kim's brother Bo Jeppesen and Horatio Lindéz. Kim and the Cinders have released a self-titled album (2008) which draws inspiration from American roots, blues, country, folk and psychedelic traditions. The album has special guest appearances by Marybell Katastrophy's Maria Timm and Giant Sand's Howe Gelb.
Oliver North Boy Choir...is a Danish indie pop/electronica act of 2006. The band consist of Mikkel Max Hansen, Camilla Florentz and Ivan Petersen. Oliver North Boy Choir's releases are solely available digitally and they do not play live shows. Since 2007, they have released nine singles and two full-length albums, the latest being the single Shadows
First Floor Power
18th Dye
Lars and The Hands of Light...is an indie rock band consisting of Lars Vognstrup, his sister Line Vognstrup as well as Peter Leth and Thomas Stück. Lars and The Hands of Light released their debut album The Looking Glas in 2010 on Crunchy Frog. The week following its release, the album was selected as The Album of the Week on DR P4, while the singles Me Me Me, Hey My Love, Hey Love and Multicolored saw considerable air time on Danish Public Radio (DR). The first single Me Me Me has been remixed by Trentemøller, Laid Back and Money Your Love. The second single Hey My Love, Hey Love was Ugens Uundgåelige on DR P3. Lars and The Hands of Light are currently working on their second album.
Thee Attacks
The Malpractice is an alias of Johannes Gammelby, formerly of I Am Bones and co-founder of Beta Satan. The Malpractice released a debut album called Tectonics in 2010 on Crunchy Frog. Tectonics mixes grunge influences and aggressive rock with catchy pop hooks and noisy synths. The Malpractice has also released a remix album called Tectonic Repercussions (2011).
Apparat Organ Quartet
Shiny Darkly

Bands formerly signed to Crunchy Frog
Düreforsög...was an experimental rock band formed in Copenhagen in 1994. Their debut Knee (Mega Records, 1995) was an experimental metal album. In 1999 they released the EP Beauty and the album Exploring Beauty on Crunchy Frog. Since then, Düreforsøg released an additional album; (Engine Machine, 2002).
The Naked
The Raveonettes
Sterling...is a Danish pop rock band initially formed under the name Novopop by Mads Nygaard and Jonas Linnet. After failing to move beyond underground recognition they disbanded in 1999. In 2000 however, Mads, Jonas and since 1997 Ole Jeppesen (drums) resurfaced under the new name; Sterling inspired by Stirling Moss and Sterling Morrisson, a guitarist with The Velvet Underground. They invited bass player Rasmus Bjerre to join and moved to Copenhagen. In 2002 Sterling had a semi-breakthrough when being selected for DR P3's first edition of Karrierekanonen a concept promoting Danish up-and-coming artists. While also playing Spot Festival in Aarhus they are signed to release their debut album Solo danser mama sjus in 2004 on the label Bird Hits Plane. While getting plenty of airtime on DR P3 and achieving several top spots on Det Elektriske Barometer, Bird Hits Plane bankrupts later that year and Sterling are left to promote their album on their own. In 2005, Sterling starts recording what is to become their EP Estadio Camp-Let released on Crunchy Frog. In 2006, Sterling released their second album Yndigt Land also on Crunchy Frog. In 2007 Rasmus Bjerre leaves the band. In November 2008, Sterling released their first album with English lyrics called Celebrations under the moniker Sterling International. In 2010, Sterling signed with Speed of Sound and has since released the album Tonemaskinen (2010).

See also 
 List of record labels

External links
 Crunchy Frog Records official website
 Vibrashop online store

Danish independent record labels
Record labels established in 1994
1994 establishments in Denmark
IFPI members